Hypena baltimoralis, the Baltimore bomolocha or Baltimore hypena, is a moth of the family Erebidae. The species was first described by Achille Guenée in 1854. It is found in the eastern part of the United States, west and south to Wisconsin, Missouri and Florida and Texas.

The moth flies from April to October depending on the location. There are at least two generations in New England and additional generations southward.

The larvae feed on maple, mainly red and silver maple.

References

baltimoralis
Moths of North America
Moths described in 1854